Rhytidicolus is a monotypic genus of South American wafer trapdoor spiders containing the single species, Rhytidicolus structor. It was first described by Eugène Simon in 1889, and has only been found in Venezuela. Originally placed with the Ctenizidae, it was moved to the Cyrtaucheniidae in 1985.

References

Cyrtaucheniidae
Monotypic Mygalomorphae genera
Spiders of South America
Taxa named by Eugène Simon